The Thames by-election of 1909 was a by-election held during the 17th New Zealand Parliament.

Background
The by-election was caused after the resignation of Liberal Party MP James McGowan, who had been appointed to the Legislative Council. McGowan announced his resignation by advertisement in the Thames Star on 7 January 1909, and in the same edition, the Mayor of Thames, Archibald Burns, announced his candidacy.

In the end, five candidates contested the election, but Burns was not among them. William Henry Lucas, a unionist, was the official representative of the liberal government. Edmund Taylor and Thomas William Rhodes were also Liberal Party member. Frederick Henry Haselden was the official candidate of the conservative opposition, but Ernest Deeble also stood for opposition interests.

Results
The following table gives the election results:

This was the first by-election where it applied, and the act stipulated that the leading candidate had to obtain an absolute majority of the votes, or else the two highest polling candidates would face each other in a second election. At the 28 January election, Taylor was the highest-polling candidate, but received only 34% of the vote, hence a second election between him and Lucas was required. That election was held on 4 February 1909, and was won by Taylor.

A week after the election, William Massey announced that the opposition will from now on be known as the Reform Party. Taylor contested the electorate again in  but Rhodes remained successful.

References

Thames 1909
1909 elections in New Zealand